Cecil Leonard (July 20, 1946August 5, 2020) was an American professional football player who was a  defensive back for two seasons with the New York Jets of the American Football League (AFL) and National Football League (NFL). He was drafted by the Jets in the eighth round of the 1969 NFL Draft. He played college football at Tuskegee University and attended East Highland High School in Sylacauga, Alabama. Leonard was also a member of the Birmingham Americans of the World Football League (WFL).

Professional career
Leonard was selected by the New York Jets of the AFL with the 208th pick in the 1969 AFL Draft. He played for the Jets during the 1969 and 1970 seasons. He played for the Birmingham Americans of the WFL during the 1974 season.

Coaching career
Leonard was head coach of the A. H. Parker High School Thundering Herd from 1973 to 1974, compiling a record of 9–10. He was head coach of the Carol W. Hayes High School Pacesetters from 1975 to 1979, helping the team advance to the state playoffs in 1976. He returned as head coach of the A. H. Parker High School Thundering Herd from 1980 to 1992, reaching the playoffs six times. Leonard was head coach of the Miles Golden Bears of Miles College from 1994 to 2000, compiling a record of 27–41–1.

Head coaching record

College

References

External links
 Just Sports Stats

2020 deaths
1946 births
American football defensive backs
American Football League players
Birmingham Americans players
Miles Golden Bears football coaches
New York Jets players
Tuskegee Golden Tigers football players
High school football coaches in Alabama
People from Sylacauga, Alabama
Players of American football from Alabama
African-American coaches of American football
African-American players of American football
20th-century African-American sportspeople
21st-century African-American people